Jonkan (also known as Jonican) is a ghost town in Pike County, Kentucky, United States. The community is still marked on county highway maps.

References

Geography of Pike County, Kentucky
Ghost towns in Kentucky